Su Jun, courtesy name Zigao (before 294 – 13 November 328) was a Chinese military general and politician of the Jin Dynasty whose rebellion against Emperor Cheng's regent Yu Liang was initially successful, allowing him to take over the imperial government, but he was eventually defeated by Tao Kan and Wen Jiao's forces and killed in battle.  The disturbance he created greatly weakened the Jin regime, which for decades did not have any ability to fight back against rival Later Zhao.

Su Jun's father Su Mo was a prime minister of the Dukedom of Anle—the dukedom that was given to Liu Shan the last emperor of Shu Han and his descendants. Su himself was known for his intelligence when he was young. In the aftermaths of Han Zhao's capture of Emperor Huai, Su gathered a group of refugees on modern Shandong Peninsula and served as the leader of self-protection league.  This eventually brought the attention of Cao Ni—a general with substantial forces in modern Shandong who frequently changed his allegiance between Han Zhao and Jin, and after Cao could not persuade Su to join him, he became determined to destroy Su. Su became fearful, and in 319 he took his group of refugees south to join the Jin imperial regime under Emperor Yuan, then located at Jiankang.  Emperor Yuan was impressed at how Su kept his group of refugees together and how he had come a long distance to join him, and he made Su a commandery governor.  He went through a succession of posts the next few years.

In 324, when the warlord Wang Dun's forces attacked Jiankang, with intent to overthrow Emperor Yuan's successor Emperor Ming, Emperor Ming summoned Su, among other generals posted on the northern border with Later Zhao, to come to his aid.  When Su's forces (and those of Liu Xia) arrived in the capital late at night, Emperor Ming personally went to visit the forces. Su was instrumental in subsequently defeating Wang's forces, preserving Jin.  After this success, Su was made the governor of Liyang Commandery (roughly modern Chaohu, Anhui).  He became proud of his success and began to have greater ambition, and he received criminals and other unwanted people into his commandery, seeking to strengthen his own personal force.

After Emperor Ming's death in 325, his four-year-old son Emperor Cheng succeeded to the throne, and his maternal uncle Yu Liang became regent.  Yu became apprehensive of Su and became convinced that he had to strip Su of his military post. In 327, he announced that Su was being promoted to minister of agriculture—a post that did not involve any military commands. Su refused, and asked to be transferred to another commandery instead. Yu in turn refused and prepare for war. Su then declared a rebellion against Yu's regency, stating, in a famous quote:

I would rather be on a hill and looking at the jail, rather than be in a jail and looking at the hill. 

In other words, he would rather lose in battle and be executed, than to submit himself to what he thought was certain imprisonment.  He allied himself with Zu Yue the governor of Yu Province (usually referring to modern eastern Henan, but by that point mostly confined to central Anhui), and headed for Jiankang.

Yu was confident he could defeat Su—so much so that he declined emergency assistance from Wen Jiao, who was then the governor of Jiang Province (modern Jiangxi) -- but instead Su won battle after battle and reached Jiankang quickly, capturing the city in early March 328 and forcing Yu to flee. Su's forces pillaged the capital, stripping both officials and commoners of their wealths and even their clothing, and even the servant girls of Empress Dowager Yu, Emperor Cheng's mother, were seized. Empress Dowager Yu, in distress, died.  (It is said that she was "humiliated" by Su, but the method of humiliation was not described.)  Su took over the imperial government and put his allies into high positions quickly.

However, Yu Liang, Wen, and Tao Kan soon entered into an alliance and headed back east to Jiankang. Eastern commanderies also rose against Su, led by Chi Jian.  Despite these provincial forces having greater numbers, Su continued to defeat them in battle after battle, and even Wen and Tao, capable generals in their own right, became apprehensive.  However, during one battle in November 328, Su was hit by a spear and fell off his horse, and the provincial forces quickly beheaded him. His forces tried to coalesce behind his brother Su Yi, but collapsed in early 329.

References

328 deaths
Jin dynasty (266–420) rebels
Generals from Shandong
Jin dynasty (266–420) generals
Jin dynasty (266–420) politicians
Politicians from Yantai
Year of birth unknown
Jin dynasty (266–420) people killed in action